The 1982 Amstel Gold Race was the 17th edition of the annual road bicycle race "Amstel Gold Race", held on Saturday April 24, 1982, in the Dutch province of Limburg. The race stretched 237 kilometres, with the start in Heerlen and the finish in Meerssen. There was a total of 152 competitors, and 39 cyclists finished the race.

Result

External links
 Results
 
 

Amstel Gold Race
April 1982 sports events in Europe
1982 in road cycling
1982 in Dutch sport
1982 Super Prestige Pernod